Moga district is one of the twenty-two districts in the state of Punjab, India. It became the 17th district of Punjab State on 24 November 1995 cut from Faridkot district. Moga District is among the largest producers of wheat and rice in Punjab, India. People from Moga City and Moga District belong to the Malwa culture.

Numerous attempts were previously made to make Moga a district but all were unsuccessful. Finally, the then Chief Minister of Punjab S. Harcharan Singh Brar agreed to the public demand to make Moga a district on 24 November 1995. Before this, Moga was the subdivision of Faridkot district and prior even to that, Moga used to be part of the Ferozepur district, but it was bifurcated and the then tehsils of Moga and Muktsar were transferred to the then-newly created Faridkot district on 7 August 1972. Moga town is the headquarters of the district, is situated on Ferozpur-Moga-Ludhiana road. Takhtupura Sahib is one of the well-known villages in this district. Takhtupura Sahib is a historical village. Moga is well for Nestle, Adani Food Pvt Ltd, and vehicle modifications. Highways connected with Moga are Jalandhar, Barnala, Ludhiana, Ferozpur, Kotkapura, Amritsar. Bus services and Railway services are well connected with some major cities like Ludhiana, Chandigarh, and Delhi.

Etymology 
The name of Moga may be ultimately derived from the Indo-Scythian king, Maues, who invaded and ruled the area in the 1st century BCE after conquering the Indo-Greek polities of the region.

History

Ancient Era 
Structures and sites dating before the reign of the Mughal emperor Akbar are exceedingly rare due to the changing course of the Sutlej river throughout the centuries. As a result, very few sites dating back to antiquity have been uncovered in the local area of Moga. This effect is more pronounced in the western parts of the district.

The location of ancient villages and towns can be inferred to the present of mounds of earth, brick, and pottery that have been excavated called thehs. These mounds are evidence that the banks of the river were inhabited in ancient times. A number of coins have been discovered at the site of these mounds.

Indus Valley Civilization 
Sites identified as belonging to the Indus Valley Civilization have been discovered in the area. Scholars have linked these finds to other sites uncovered in the Rupnagar area of Punjab.

Vedic Period 
The composition of the Rigveda is proposed to have occurred in the Punjab circa 1500 and 1200 BCE.

Post-Vedic Period (After 600 BCE) 
The region of Moga belongs to the Malwai cultural zone, named after the ancient Malava tribe whom inhabited the area in ancient times. During the reign of Porus in the 4th century BCE, the southern area of Punjab was ruled by both the Kshudrakas and Malavas. Some scholars believe they were pushed southwards due to martial and social pressures occurring in the north. Alexander of Macedon warred with the Malavas for control of the region. This wrestle for power is recorded as being fierce and bitter in Greek historical accounts. After the withdrawal of Macedonian forces in the area, the Malavas joined with anti-Greek forces to usurp Hellenistic power and control of the region, leading to the formation of the Mauryan dynasty.

The decline of the Mauryan dynasty coincided with an invasion of Bactrian Greeks, whom successfully took control of the region in the second century BCE. This seizure of power in the Punjab by the Bactrians led to the migration of the Malavas from the area to Rajasthan, and from there to the now-called Malwa plateau of Central India.

Mediaeval Era 

The area is believed to have been under the writ of the Punwar clan of Rajputs during the early-mediaeval period. They were headquartered in Janer, at the old riverbed location of the Sutlej river, over six kilometres north of the present-day city of Moga. Later on, the Bhati clan of Rajputs, originating from Jaisalmer, established themselves in the area, superseding the previous Punwars for authority of the region.

Jat tribes, whom had been practicing migratory, nomadic-pastoralism for much of their recorded history, began to permanently settle the Moga area during this time and take up a sedentary lifestyle of settled agriculture. First of them being the Dhaliwal clan, who firmly established themselves southeast of Moga at Kangar. They appear to have possibly obtained high repute, seeing as a woman of the clan, Dharm, who was the daughter of Chaudhary Mihr Mitha Dhaliwal, was wedded to the Mughal emperor Akbar. The Gill clan of Jats, originally based in Bathinda, dispersed to the western parts of Moga district around this time. At the end of the 16th century, the Sidhu clan of Jats migrated northwards to the area from Rajasthan. A branch of the Sidhus, the Brars, established themselves in the south of Gill territory, pushing its former inhabitants northwards whilst taking control of their key places in the process. The Brars founded a chieftainship at Kot Kapura, 40 kilometres west of present-day Moga, and rebelled against the overlordship of Nawab Ise Khan, the Manj governor. Most of the Jat tribes of the local area were converted to Sikhism by the missionary works of the seventh Guru of the Sikhs, Har Rai.

In 1715 CE, Nawab Ise Khan, the Manj governor, stirred a rebellion against the Mughal hegemony but was defeated and killed. In 1760 CE, the ascendency of Sikh power became grounded after the defeat of Adina Beg, who was the last Mughal governor of Lahore.

Modern Era

Sikh Period 
The forces of Tara Singh, the misldar of the Dallewalia Misl of the Sikh Confederacy, led incursions into modern-day Moga district, all the way to Ramuwala and Mari. Fortresses (ਕਿਲਾ Kilā in Punjabi) were constructed at both of these places by the Sikh misl. The local nawab of Kot Ise Khan in modern-day Moga district became a protectorate of the Ahluwalia Misl. In 1763-64 CE, Gujar Singh, his brother Nusbaha Singh, and his two nephews, Gurbaksh Singh and Mastan Singh, of the Bhangi Misl, crossed the Sutlej river after a sacking of Kasur and gained control of the Firozepur area (including Moga) whilst Jai Singh Gharia, another band from the same quarters, seized Khai, Wan, and Bazidpur, and subordinated them.

British Period 
During the First Anglo-Sikh War, the forces of the Sikh Empire crossed the river Sutlej on 16 December 1845, and fought battles at Mudki, Firozshah, Aliwal, and Sabraon. The Sikh forces were defeated by the British and retreated back beyond the Sutlej. After the war, the British acquired all former territory of the Lahore Darbar south and east of the Sutlej. When the Sutlej campaign drew to a close at the end of 1846, the territories of Khai, Baghuwala, Ambarhar, Zira, and Mudki, with portions of Kot Kapura, Guru Har Sahai, Jhumba, Kot Bhai, Bhuchcho, and Mahraj were added to the Firozepur district. Other acquisitions by the British were divided between the Badhni and Ludhiana districts. In 1847, the Badhni district was dissolved and the following areas were incorporated into the Firozepur district: Mallanwala, Makhu, Dharmkot, Kot Ise Khan, Badhni, Chuhar Chak, Mari, and Sadasinghwala.

During the Mutiny of 1857, there were reports of a Roman Catholic church being burnt down amongst other buildings of the colonial establishment in Firozepur district during sparks of tension.

During the late 19th century, the Kuka movement was prevalent in the areas of Moga, with many of its followers drawing from the laypersons of the district. The Kukas are believed to be one of the first resistance movement of the subcontinent towards Indian independence from European powers.

During the Indian Independence Movement, many revolutionaries came from Moga district. Many of them were tried and executed as a result of their activities against the colonial government.

Towns
The towns of Bagha Purana, Badhni Kalan, Dharamkot, Kot Ise Khan, Nihal Singh Wala and Ghal Kalan fall in Moga District. The villages like Rattian Khosa Randhir, Dhalleke, Thathi Bhai, Rajiana, Dunne Ke, Landhe Ke, Samadh Bhai, Kotla Rai-ka, Bhekha, Bughipura, Daudhar, Dhudike, Lopon, Himmatpura, Manooke, and Chugawan also fall within this district.

Bagha Purana lies on the main road connecting Moga and Faridkot and thus is a major hub for buses to all across Punjab. Bagha Purana's police station has the largest jurisdiction in Punjab; over 65 'pinds' or villages are within its control. The town is basically divided into 3 'pattis' or sections: Muglu Patti (the biggest one), Bagha Patti, and Purana Patti. The town has its fair share of rich people and thus the standard of living is above average as compared to the surrounding towns and villages.

Dharamkot is a city and a municipal council in the Moga district. Daudhar is the largest village in Moga.

Demographics

According to the 2011 census Moga district has a population of 995,746, roughly equal to the nation of Fiji or the US state of Montana. This gives it a ranking of 447th in India (out of a total of 640). 
Its population growth rate over the decade 2001-2011 was 10.9%. Moga has a sex ratio of 893 females for every 1000 males, and a literacy rate of 71.6%. Scheduled Castes made up 36.50% of the population.

At the time of the 2011 census, 96.21% of the population spoke Punjabi and 3.21% Hindi as their first language.

Politics

Education

Moga city is also known for a number of educational institutes such as Engineering Colleges, Schools, etc.

Some of the most famous schools and colleges of Moga City are:
 BMS Institute of Education
 DM College
 Guru Nanak college
 D N Model Senior Secondary School
 Baba Kundan Singh Memorial Law College
  ISF College of Pharmacy /
 Lala Laj Pat Rai Institute Of Engineering & Technology
 Sacred Heart School
 Blooming Buds Senior Secondary school
 Mount Litera Zee School, Moga
 Desh Bhagat Institute of Engineering and Management
 Little Millennium School
 Gold Coast Sports Academy
 National convent senior secondary school
 Adarsh Model High School
 Oxford School

Notable people
 Gurinder Singh, Fifth and Present Chief of Radha Soami Satsang Beas
 Narinder Singh Kapany, Indian born American Physicist known for his work in fiber optics
 Lala Lajpat Rai, an Indian freedom fighter from Village Dhudhike
 Jathedar Tota Singh former Punjab Education Minister and former Agriculture Minister
 Jaswant Singh Kanwal, Sahitya academic fellowship for the book 'Pakhi' 1996 and Sahitya Akademi award for 'Taushali Di Hanso' 1998. He was from Dhudike vill. 
 Lachhman Singh Gill, Chief Minister of Punjab from Village Chuhar Chak
 Sonu Sood, Indian Film Actor
 Roshan Prince, Actor and Singer
 Harmanpreet Kaur, Batswoman in the Indian Women's National Cricket Team and Captain of the T20 Indian Women's National Cricket Team
 Subedar Joginder Singh, was an Indian Army soldier, and recipient of the Param Vir Chakra.
 Baldev Singh, author, winner of the Sahitya Akademi Award

See also
Maddoke
Singhanwala

References

External links

  
 DISTRICT CENSUS HANDBOOK - MOGA DISTRICT

 
Districts of Punjab, India
1995 establishments in Punjab, India